The 1993–94 Nebraska Cornhuskers men's basketball team represented the University of Nebraska, Lincoln during the 1993–94 college basketball season. Led by head coach Danny Nee (8th season), the Cornhuskers competed in the Big Eight Conference and played their home games at the Bob Devaney Sports Center. They finished with a record of 20–10 overall and 7–7 in Big Eight Conference play. Nebraska won the Big Eight tournament to earn an automatic bid to the 1994 NCAA tournament as the #6 seed in the East region.

Roster

Schedule and results 

|-
!colspan=12 style=| Regular season

|-
!colspan=12 style=| Big Eight tournament

|-
!colspan=12 style=| NCAA Tournament

Rankings

References

Nebraska
Nebraska Cornhuskers men's basketball seasons
Corn
Corn
Nebraska